The women's 100 breaststroke at the 1987 European Championships was held on August 21, 1987, in Strasbourg, France.

Finals

References

1987 in swimming